Osada Stawy Grojeckie  is a settlement in the administrative district of Gmina Oświęcim, within Oświęcim County, Lesser Poland Voivodeship, in southern Poland.

References

Osada Stawy Grojeckie